The United Kingdom European Communities membership referendum was a public vote that took place on 5 June 1975, on whether the United Kingdom should remain a member of the European Communities which was principally the European Economic Community (the Common Market) as it was known at the time. At the time the UK had already been a member of the EC for two and a half years since joining back on 1 January 1973 and was the first ever national referendum of its kind to be held in the country.

This article lists, by voting area, all the results of the referendum, each ordered into national sections.

Under the provisions of the Referendum Act 1975 there was a total of 68 counting areas across the United Kingdom in which counting took place locally. Once the counting areas had officially declared, their results were then relayed by the returning officers to the Chief counting officer Sir Philip Allen who later declared the final result, In England there was a total of 47 counting areas which were made up of the then county council areas of England along with Greater London and the Isles of Scilly. In Wales there was just 8 counting areas which were also made up by the then county council areas. In Scotland the then 12 administrative regions were used as the counting areas with Northern Ireland acting as a single counting area. This meant that of the counting areas the Isles of Scilly with 1,447 eligible voters had the smallest electorate and was also the smallest geographically and Greater London with 5,250,343 eligible voters had the largest electorate and Highland in northern Scotland was the largest geographically with 127,925 eligible voters.

This made for a highly centralised national count with local authorities (district councils) in England and Wales verifying votes locally after polls closed but counting of all totals were only permitted to be held and declared at county council or Scottish regional council level apart from the Isles of Scilly and was not overseen by any independent public body.

Verification of the votes took place after the polling stations closed but counting of the votes did not start until the following morning on Friday 6 June from 09:00 BST, the day after the poll took place and presented unique challenges as large venues were required as there had been no previous experience of counting on such a large and centralised scale and took almost fourteen hours to complete.

United Kingdom 
The national result for the United Kingdom was declared just before  2300 BST on Friday 6 June 1975 by the Chief Counting Officer Sir Philip Allen at Earls Court Exhibition Centre in London. With a national turnout of 64% the target to secure the majority win for the winning side was 12,951,598 votes. The decision by the electorate was a decisive 'Yes' to continued EC membership which won by a huge majority of 8,908,508 votes (34.5%) over those who had voted 'No' to reject continued membership. The result saw decisive 'Yes' votes from all four countries of the United Kingdom and also saw 'Yes' majority votes from all but two counting areas to continued membership of the European Communities (Common Market) which would later become the European Union.

Results by United Kingdom constituent countries

England

England was broken down into 47 counting areas.

Northern Ireland
Northern Ireland was a single counting area.

Scotland

Scotland was broken down into 12 counting areas.

Wales

Wales was broken down into 8 counting areas.

See also
Referendum Act 1975
2016 United Kingdom European Union membership referendum
Results of the 2016 United Kingdom European Union membership referendum
European Communities Act 1972 (UK)

References

European Communities membership
Referendums related to the European Union
Withdrawal from the European Union
Referendum
1975 referendums
1975 in international relations
1975 in the European Economic Community
Referendum, 1975
Election results in the United Kingdom